or the  is a mountainous district in the Kantō region and Kōshin'etsu region, Japan. It covers the western part of Tokyo, the western part of Saitama Prefecture, the southwestern part of Gunma Prefecture, the southeastern part of Nagano Prefecture, and the northern part of Yamanashi Prefecture. Oku (奥, oku) means the interior, Okuchichibu means the interior of Chichibu (秩父, chichibu). The meaning of the word Okuchichibu is based on the point of view from the Kantō region. This mountain area consists of folded mountains and ranges from 1000 to 2600 meters in height.  is the highest at 2601m.

Some of the mountains in the Okuchichibu Mountains include:
  (2017 m)
  (2077 m)
  (2109 m)
  (1953 m)
  (2158 m)
  (2082 m)
  (2468 m)
  (2475 m)
  (2483 m)
  (2591 m)
  (2601 m)
  (2579 m)
  (2599 m)
  (2230 m)
  (2418 m)
  (1818 m)
  (1643 m)
  (772 m)
  (1723 m)
  (1483 m)
  (1081 m)
 
 
 (Mt. Myōhō 1332 m, Mt. Shiraiwa 1921 m, Mt. Kumotori 2017 m)
  (1794 m)
  (1332 m)
  (1523 m)
  (1921 m)
  (1427 m)
  (2036 m)
  (1740 m)
  (2000 m)
  (2132 m)
 
 
  (2232 m)
  (2031 m)
  (1777 m)
  (1650 m)

See also
 Tanabe Jyuji

External links

References 

Mountain ranges of Gunma Prefecture
Mountain ranges of Nagano Prefecture
Mountain ranges of Saitama Prefecture
Mountain ranges of Tokyo
Mountain ranges of Yamanashi Prefecture